Mohammedan Sporting Club is an Indian multi-sports club based in Kolkata, West Bengal. Its football team competes in I-League, the second-tier of Indian football, as well as in Calcutta Football League (CFL), the oldest football league in Asia. Formed in February 1891, it is one of the oldest active football clubs in the country.

It was over three decades later since the foundation, the club became affiliated with the Indian Football Association (IFA) to play in the second division of CFL before earning promotion to the premier division of CFL in 1933 and a year later, Mohammedan became the first Indian team to win the league and in 1938 became the first team to win it for five consecutive times. After the independence of India, Mohammedan became the first Indian club to win a football tournament on foreign soil by lifting the Aga Khan Gold Cup in 1960. In 1996, the club was one of the founding members of India's first nationwide league – National Football League (NFL). Mohammedan has never won a top-tier league, only managing to win the 2004–05 NFL Second Division to qualify for NFL and the 2020 I-League Qualifiers to qualify for I-League, which was then the first-tier league of India. They have won the Federation Cup twice in 1983–84 and 1984–85.

Founded during the early years of India's independence movement, Mohammedan had been a symbol of progressive Muslim identity through the tumultuous period of rebellion and the subsequent struggle for status in an altered post-partition landscape. Therefore the club is primarily supported by the Muslim population of Bengal and it had provided a major backing to the community residing in Kolkata by spreading the sport to a sizeable population during its foundation days. This led to communal rivalry with its cross-town competitors – East Bengal and Mohun Bagan (now ATK Mohun Bagan), which were primarily supported by the Hindu population of Bengal during the early decades. The rivalries with both the teams have become non-communal and mostly insignificant over the course of time due to the rarity of meeting them at major tournaments.

History

The beginning and early decades (1887–1930) 

In 1887, under the leadership of Khan Bahadur Aminul Islam, a sporting club named Jubilee Club was founded, which was later renamed into Crescent Club and then into Hamidia Club. Finally in 1891, Islam reformed the club and named it Mohammedan Sporting Club to represent the Bengali Mohammedans living in Calcutta. The club participated in a number of local tournaments after its foundation but came into prominence only after they won the Cooch Behar Cup in 1902, 1906 and in 1909. Initially, the club's objective wasn't strictly communal, and the club members often showed sincere appreciation towards achievements of its counterpart – Mohun Bagan AC, which was then supported by both Bengali Hindus as well as Muslims. During Mohun Bagan's historic 1911 IFA Shield victory, the members of the club "were almost mad and rolling on the ground with joyous excitement on the victory of their Hindu brethren."

Khan Sahib Syed Ahmed Rashid took a very keen interest in the social and sporting life in Bengal and was the elected Joint Secretary of Mohammedan, from 1925 to 1932. Although it was not before 1927 that the financial condition of the club improved when the team was able to play in the second division of the Calcutta Football League (CFL). In order to overcome the precarious financial state of the club, the Joint Secretaries of the club made an appeal to the public "to support a scheme of the club, extending its activities in the social sphere of Muslims", and also requested for donations of ₹3,500 to ₹4,500. With the improved performances of the club in every sport it participated, the management was able to acquire a considerable amount of investment which helped the club to build better teams. Due to Rashid's widespread influence in sports in Bengal, Sir Francis Stanley Jackson, the Governor of Bengal, accepted the patronage of the club.

During Satyagraha, Rashid helped to organise and make the club participate in the Monsoon League in 1930, the CFL in 1930 and 1931, and number of other sports tournaments, when every native club was boycotting sporting events, which was greatly appreciated by IFA, Bengal Hockey Association and Cricket Board of Control in Bengal and Assam. In 1930, Mohammedan finished last in the league table and was on the verge of being relegated out of the CFL 2nd Division, but was allowed to continue when one of the second division teams – East Indian Railway discontinued.

The golden period (1931–1947)
 
One of the club officials, CA Aziz concentrated on creating a strong team through modern strategies and was one of the only Indians to first realise the importance of playing in boots. Aziz recruited Mohun Bagan rejects like Kaleh Khan and Hafiz Rahid in 1931, and also players from different parts of India were gradually brought in, often in the name of religion. Players like Masum, Mahiuddin and Rahmat came from Bangalore, while Jumma Khan arrived from North-West Frontier Province, thus forming a truly cosmopolitan team. The whole team had a Muslim core, with no players outside the community. This helped Aziz to create unmatched unity in his squad which showed on and off the field. In 1933, Mohammedan qualified for the premier division of CFL for the first time in its history by topping the second division. Under the captaincy of Khurshid Anwar, Mohammedan became the first native club to capture the CFL title in 1934, in their very first year in top division. In March 1935, he was unanimously elected as the General Secretary of the club for the second time and in October that year he organised a successful tour to Rangoon, Mandalay, Maymyo, Colombo, Galle, Kandy, Madras, Bangalore and Mysore for the football team. That year, the captain's armband was handed over to the young and charismatic Abbas Mirza and later in the summer, Mohammedan recruited goalkeeper Osman Jan from Crescent Club in Delhi. With Osman Jan under the bar, Taj Mohammad and Jumma Khan, were part of a strong and formidable back-line. The trio of Rahim, Hafiz Rashid and Rahmat led the goalscoring duties and, Rashid and Rahim would go on to become the league's top scorer in 1935 with 16 goals and 1938 with 18 goals respectively. Along with new and young recruits every year, two defining names remained constant in the team – Syed Abdus Samad, who joined in 1933, and Mohammed Salim, who returned for a second spell in 1934. In 1936, Mohammedan became the first all-Indian team since 1911 to win IFA Shield by defeating Calcutta CFC in the final by 2–1 with goals from Rashid Jr. and Rahim. With their third league win that year, they also became the first Indian club to win the League-Shield "double". During this time, Salim took trials at Celtic FC, and was selected for the team but after playing two friendlies in Scottish Football Alliance, he returned to Mohammedan being homesick, even though being offered contracts from Celtic as well as from clubs in Germany. Thus, he became the first Indian to play for a foreign club. From 1934 to 1938, Mohammedan won the league for record five consecutive times and missed out the title only once in 1939 from 1934 to 1941, when they declined to play in protest against IFA. By this time Mohammedan became the undisputed Invincibles of CFL and football in India was no more only about the British against the Indians but also the Hindus (via Mohun Bagan and East Bengal Club) versus the Muslims.

Mohammedan's another great achievement came in the form of Durand Cup, which was then reserved only for British and British-Indian regimental teams until 1940, when civilian teams were also allowed to participate due to most regiments called in for World War II. The final was scheduled on 12 December 1940 at Irwin Amphitheatre in New Delhi and numerous eminent Muslim politicians flew in from far-off cities like Calcutta, Dhaka, Hyderabad and Bhopal, while common supporters arrived in trains and tongas to watch the match. It was also the first time a football game of such importance was being officiated by an Indian referee, Captain Harnam Singh. Along with around 1,00,000 spectators, as per traditions, Lord Linlithgow, the Viceroy of India, stood witness as Mohammedan defeated Royal Warwickshire Regiment 2–1, under the captaincy of Masum and goals coming from Rashid and Saboo. This victory by a team of only Muslim players at the capital city provided a massive boost to the Muslim national movement in the country. They also captured the Rover's Cup without conceding a goal in the tournament and beating Bangalore Muslims FC 1–0 in the final, thus creating another unique record of holding CFL, Durand Cup and Rover's Cup titles all in the same year. Their successes led to frenzied support from Muslims in every city of India, followed by increased number of donations to improve the club. They had an abundance of finances and were the first Indian team to play with boots, with a focus on proper diet and physical fitness for their players. In 1941, they won their second Shield, when they beat King's Own Scottish Borderers in the final. They also became the first Indian team to score 100 goals in a year, when they scored 110 goals in all competitions that year. They also became the first Indian club to retain the Shield, when they saw off East Bengal's challenge in 1942 final with a goal from Noor Mohammad. Due to the huge popularity, in 1943, Kaiser Shumsher Jung Bahadur Rana, the Prime Minister of Nepal, came all the way to Calcutta to play for Mohammedan, thus he became the first non-Muslim and Hindu player to don Mohammedan colours. The following years until the Independence of India, Mohammedan lost its dominance and failed to bring back any major silverware into their club tent.

Considerable period of success (1947–1980) 
After the partition in 1947, the club lost many of its elite patrons, members as well as players, who chose to move to newly formed Islamic state of Pakistan, and soon there was a struggle to run which became evident with the club's performance in major tournaments. Yet, few players returned to continue playing for Mohammedan as foreign nationals. Regardless, the club managed to win the first CFL title in the post-independent India in 1948. Mohammedan continued to bring in numerous football talents from Pakistan and Masood Fakhri became the first Pakistani international to sign with the club in 1955. After 8 years of title drought, Mohammedan went on to win the Rover's Cup for the second time in 1956 by beating the defending champions Mohun Bagan 3–1 in the final. The Rover's Cup win paved the way to regain Mohammedan's lost dominance over football in India and bagged the League-Shield double of CFL and IFA Shield next year. In the league, Mohammedan surpassed East Bengal by a point and defeated Railways 3–0 in the Shield final. By the 1960s, Mohammedan changed its rules and formed teams with players from other communities too. In 1960, as a top club of India, Mohammedan was invited to the Aga Khan Gold Cup, which was at that time considered a continental tournament to determine the unofficial Asian champions. Held in Dhaka, Mohammedan became the first Indian side to win a trophy on foreign soil, beating the Perserikatan champions Persatuan Sepakbola Makassar 4–1 in the final. The match is still considered to be one of the greatest matches ever played in Dhaka, and also featured renowned Pakistani forward Mohammad Omar Baloch for Mohammedan. Despite considerably low performance domestically, Mohammedan was still one of the biggest crowd pullers, especially in Delhi, during Durand Cup and DCM Trophy. The next CFL success came only after a decade since their last win, when Mohammedan became the champions without losing a single match, registering their tenth CFL title. In 1971, Mohammedan won the IFA Shield without conceding a goal and by defeating Tollygunge Agragami FC 2–0 in the final.

Gradual downfall and a period of major failure (1981–2019) 
In the 80s, the success came at the beginning with Mohammedan winning the '81 CFL unbeaten for the third time, surpassing Mohun Bagan by a point. The following year, Mohammedan appointed one of the iconic Indian footballers, Syed Nayeemuddin to coach the team and also roped in the biggest foreign names, Iranian duo Majid Bishkar and Jamshid Nassiri, from their local rivals East Bengal. Bishkar became the first player to play for Mohammedan with the experience of appearing in FIFA World Cup. In 1983, Mohammedan won its first Federation Cup, which was then the only true national championship, by defeating Mohun Bagan 2–0 in the final, and successfully defended the Cup by defeating East Bengal 1–0 in the next year's final. In 1985, they signed Nigerian striker Chima Okorie from Chandigarh FC, who was considered one of the greatest foreign players in India. The later 80s saw a continued drop in performance, winning only minor silverwares with only major success coming in the form of 1987 Rover's Cup. In 1990, Mohammedan participated in the Jawaharlal Nehru Centenary Club Cup, which was the only international club tournament held in India. Mohammedan, as the only Indian team, qualified for the semi-finals by defeating the Zambian national team 1–0 and FC Metalist 1925 Kharkiv 1–0 but losing 2–0 to Gimnasia Esgrima. In the semi-final, Mohammedan lost 1–0 to Paraguayan Primera División champion Club Olimpia. Nigerian midfielder Emeka Ezeugo of Mohammedan was awarded Taj Bengal Trophy for player of the tournament. Mohammedan was nominated from India to participate in the 1992–93 Asian Cup Winners' Cup and was scheduled to play against Omani Professional League champions Fanja SC in the first round but they withdrew their team from the competition. Near the end of the century, all the 'Big Three  clubs of Maidan faced serious financial jeopardy due to increased expenses to compete at the top level and limited source of income, only relying upon supporters' fund and contributions from individuals often belonging to political field. The players were being unpaid for months at a time and coaches were frequently being replaced due to unimproved performance. Mohammedan's trophy drought continued and in 1996 they became one of the founding members of India's first national league – National Football League (NFL). Under the coaching of newly appointed Mridul Banerjee, Mohammedan finished in the bottom two of group table and was relegated to NFL 2nd Division in their debut season. In the following season, Mohammedan finished in the bottom half of the group table, therefore getting relegated from NFL 2nd Division as well. During this time, Vijay Mallya owned United Breweries Group, approached with partnership offers to Mohammedan along with the other two Maidan clubs – Mohun Bagan and East Bengal, but the club being named after Prophet Muhammad refused to accept funding from a liquor brand.  After two seasons, Mohammedan once again qualified for NFL 2nd Division in 2000–01 only to get relegated once again. With hopes of improving the standards, Mohammedan signed their first foreign coach, former Nigerian club player, Chibuzor Nwakanma. In the next season, the club played in the NFL 2nd Division under the coaching of Mohammed Habib and achieved promotion by finishing second in the final league table. Club icon, Nassiri, was put in-charge for the club's second NFL campaign by newly appointed technical director,  PK Banerjee, a renowned footballer as well as coach himself, but Mohammedan suffered another relegation. With the return of Habib as the coach, the club successfully won the 2004–05 NFL 2nd Division, thereby achieving promotion. With renowned tactician Subhas Bhowmick at the helm, the club finished eighth in the 2005–06 NFL and avoided relegation from NFL for the first time, but the following season they eventually got relegated by finishing ninth in the table.  Until then NFL and NFL 2nd Division were semi-professional football leagues, but in 2007 the leagues were reformed into professional I-League and I-League 2nd Division respectively. With the appointment of Shabbir Ali as the official coach of the club, Mohammedan achieved promotion to 2008–09 I-League but got relegated after finishing eleventh in the table. In November 2010, Mohammedan organised Platinum Jubilee Celebration Cup tournament to commemorate the 75th anniversary of their 1934 CFL win, with Mohun Bagan, East Bengal and the world's oldest existing football club Sheffield FC being invited to play. As brand ambassador of Mohammedan, former Indian cricket captain Sourav Ganguly played for the club, wearing number 99 jersey, against East Bengal in a 1–0 defeat. The tournament culminated with a Kolkata Derby, where East Bengal emerged victorious after a penalty shoot-out. In 2013, under Sanjoy Sen, Mohammedan would achieve promotion to I-League and also put an end to a long wait for major success by winning Durand Cup and then the 2014 IFA Shield by beating Bangladesh Premier League runners-up Sheikh Jamal Dhanmondi Club in the penalty shootout.It's Mohammedan Sporting vs Dhanmondi in IFA Shield final  The Times of India. Retrieved 1 July 2021 But once again faced relegation in the 2013–14 I-League after finishing at the bottom of the table. Later in 2015, they participated in Sheikh Kamal International Club Cup in Bangladesh.

The club showed major signs of reformation in 2016, when Ghazal Uz Zafar, a Kolkata-based young entrepreneur, took over as the General Secretary of the club. It was under his secretaryship, the club became runners-up in 2016 CFL after eight years and also lifted the 2016 Sikkim Governor's Gold Cup for the first time since 1980 by defeating Jhapa XI of Nepal by 1–0. In 2018, they emerged as the champions of Bordoloi Trophy, defeating Oil India Limited by 3–1 margin. But their wait for success in the national league and other major tournaments was yet to come to an end.

 Revival of the lost glory (2020–present) 

In October 2020, under the secretaryship of Sk. Wasim Akram, Mohammedan for the first time entered into a joint-venture with a Gurgaon based sports management company Bunkerhill, with an aim to eventually qualify or enter the Indian Super League, which had been promoted as the top-tier league in 2019. With newly appointed Spanish coach José Hevia, Mohammedan got promoted to 2020–21 I-League after winning 2020 I-League Qualifiers, which temporarily had replaced the traditional I-League 2nd Division due to COVID-19 pandemic restrictions. The club signed previous I-League season's top scorer, Pedro Manzi along with Bangladeshi football team captain Jamal Bhuyan for their AFC quota.Bangladesh skipper Jamal Bhuyan now on Mission Mohammedan Sporting  The Times of India. Retrieved 2 July 2021 After Hevia being sacked mid-season, Mohammedan finished at sixth under their technical director Sankarlal Chakraborty. In May 2021, the club appointed Russia's former assistant coach Andrey Chernyshov, and with him at the helm, Mohammedan reached the Durand Cup final for the first time since 2013 but fell short against FC Goa by just a solitary goal. The following month, Mohammedan clinched their twelfth CFL title after forty long years of wait by defeating Railway FC 1–0 in the final of a newer and shorter knock-out format. As one of the title contenders with Serbian midfielder Nikola Stojanović holding the captain's arm-band and Trinbagonian international Marcus Joseph leading the goalscoring charts by 15 goals, Mohammedan for the first time ran for their maiden national league title at 2021–22 I-League, but finished second after a 2–1 defeat against the table toppers Gokulam Kerala FC on the final matchday in a must win situation. In October, the club retained their CFL title.

Crest and colours

Crest
The crest of Mohammedan Sporting Club is derived from the typical Islamic iconographic symbol used in various historical contexts. It has the star and crescent in middle, which is partially surrounded by floral patterns and, the name of the club, its year of foundation and the country based inscribed below within the shapes of waving banners. The colour of the crest is also in accordance to the Quranic colour of green.

Colours

The club had adopted the nickname of Black Panthers since their Blank Panther inspired jerseys for 2020–21 season, which also resembled their traditional club colours of black (primary) and white (secondary), hence historically they were often termed as "সাদা–কালো ব্রিগেড".

Sponsorship

Slogan
"Jan Jan Mohammedan" (Bengali: 'জান জান মহামেডান') is the slogan popular among club supporters.

Stadiums

Historically to host their home games, the club has used several grounds in Kolkata, Howrah, Barasat and Kalyani, including Eden Gardens, which has been reserved for cricket since Vivekananda Yuba Bharati Krirangan opened in 1984.

 Vivekananda Yuba Bharati Krirangan 
Mohammedan plays most of its major fixtures at Vivekananda Yuba Bharati Krirangan, commonly called Salt Lake Stadium, located in the suburb of Bidhannagar in Kolkata. A multi-purpose stadium owned by the Government of West Bengal under Youth Affairs and Sports Department, the VYKB primarily hosts football matches, apart from occasional track and field events. The stadium was built in 1984, predominately for matches like Kolkata Derby that featured attendance too huge for the grounds in Maidan to accommodate. Before its renovation in 2011, it was the largest football stadium in the world by capacity of 120,000. Prior to the construction and opening of Rungrado 1st of May Stadium in 1989, it was the largest football stadium in the world. It is currently the fourth largest sports stadium in Asia by capacity. The gigantic stadium features three tiers of concrete galleries with nine entry gates, including a VIP gate, and 30 ramps for the spectators to reach the viewing blocks. The stadium has been mostly used to host major home games like in National Football League and I-League.

Mohammedan Sporting Ground
The Mohammedan Sporting Ground is operated by Mohammedan, which is located in Maidan on the northern side of Fort William and adjacent to the club tent. The ground has natural grass turf with a capacity of 25,000. After the renovations in 2017, the ground was installed with floodlights, an air-conditioned press room and a gymnasium named after The Greatest Muhammad Ali to honour his visit to the club in December 1990. Yet the stadium is not upto the standards required to host top-tier league matches and currently the stadium mostly hosts matches for Calcutta Football League, lower division leagues and youth tournaments.

Rivalry
Rivalry of the Big Three

Mohammedan previously had a significant rivalry against the neighbouring clubs – Mohun Bagan (now ATK Mohun Bagan) and East Bengal. The initiation of the feuds goes back to the early 30s, when Mohammedan came out as a dominant contender for Calcutta Football League by winning seven out of eight titles from 1934 to 1941. Since then until 1958, all the CFL titles were won among these three rival clubs, often referred as the Big Three of Maidan (Bengali: ময়দানের তিন প্রধান), and even in other major tournaments like Durand Cup, Rover's Cup and IFA Shield, the three clubs contended against each other for the honours. The rivalry initially had a communal background since Mohammedan being a Muslim-only club representing the Muslim population of Kolkata, thereby forcing the Hindus in the city to compete via their support for Mohun Bagan and East Bengal even though they weren't communal clubs themselves. By the 1960s, communal tension involved in the feud became insignificant as the club began to regularly sign non-Muslim players as well. But the club also lost their dominance in Indian football and after the inception of national tournaments like Federation Cup and National Football League, Mohammedan was no more a top club and mostly playing in the lower tiers. Thus, the club rarely met Mohun Bagan and East Bengal at major tournaments due to them being in the top tier. Unlike the ever fierce East Bengal-Mohun Bagan feud termed as Kolkata Derby, the matches including Mohammedan and Mohun Bagan or East Bengal is commonly termed as Mini Kolkata Derby.

Players
First-team squad

Current technical staff
Coaching staff

Management

 Previous seasons 
Only the seasons since the introduction of a national league in 1996 has been stated below.

Managerial history

 Syed Nayeemuddin (1982–1985)
 Shabbir Ali (1985–1992)
 Sudip Chatterjee (1997)
 Mridul Banerjee (1997–1998)
 Pungam Kannan (1998–1999)
 Mohammed Habib (1999–2000)
 Syed Firoze (2000–2001)
 Chandu Roy Chowdhury (2001)Season ending Transfers 2001: India  indianfootball.de. Retrieved 1 July 2021
 Chibuzor Nwakanma (2001–2002)
 Mohammed Habib (2002–2003)
 Shankar Maitra (2003)
 Jamshid Nassiri (2003–2004)
 Mohammed Habib (2005)Mohd. Sporting drops nine players, coach. archive.vn. Retrieved 3 July 2021.
 Subhash Bhowmick (2005–2006)
 Shabbir Ali (2007–2010)
 Ayodeji Fuja Tope (2010–2011)Tope Fuja new Md. Sp. coach Archive.vn. Retrieved 3 July 2021
 Syed Nayeemuddin (2011)
 Aloke Mukherjee (2011–2013)
 Abdul Aziz Moshood (2013)
 Sanjoy Sen (2013–2014)
 Mridul Banerjee (2014–2015)
 Ananta Kumar Ghosh (2015–2016)
 Ranjan Chowdhury (2017–2018)
 Biswajit Bhattacharya (2017–2018)
 Raghunath Nandi (2018–2019)
 Subrata Bhattacharya (2019)
 Saheed Ramon (2019)
 Yan Law (2020)
 José Carlos Hevia (2020–2021)
 Sankarlal Chakraborty (2021)
 Andrey Chernyshov (2021–2022)রাশিয়া থেকে UEFA প্রো লাইসেন্সধারী কোচ উড়িয়ে আনল Mohammedan  zeenews.india.com. Retrieved 4 July 2021.
  Kibu Vicuña (2022–2023)
  Mehrajuddin Wadoo (2023–)

Past and present internationals

The players below had senior international cap(s) for their respective countries. Players whose name is listed, represented their countries before or after playing for Mohammedan SC.

Asia

Africa

North America

Honours

InternationalAga Khan Gold CupWinners (1): 1960Nehru Centenary Club Cup
Semi-finals (1): 1990

Domestic
League
I-League
Runners-up (1): 2021–22
NFL 2nd Division
Champions (1): 2004–05
Runners-up (1): 2002–03
I-League 2nd Division
Champions (1): 2020
Runners-up (2): 2008, 2013
Calcutta Football League
Champions (13): 1934, 1935, 1936, 1937, 1938, 1940, 1941, 1948, 1957, 1967, 1981, 2021, 2022
Runners-up (9): 1942, 1944, 1949, 1960, 1971, 1992, 2002, 2008, 2016–17
 
Cup

Federation Cup
Winners (2): 1983–84, 1984–85
Runners-up (3): 1981–82, 1989–90, 2003
I-League Qualifiers
Champions (1): 2019–20
Durand Cup
Champions (2): 1940, 2013
Runners-up (4): 1959, 1980, 1992, 2021 
IFA Shield
Champions (6): 1936, 1941, 1942, 1957, 1971, 2014
Runners-up (4): 1938, 1963, 1982, 1990
Rovers Cup
Champions (6): 1940, 1956, 1959, 1980, 1984, 1987
Runners-up (8): 1941, 1955, 1957, 1958, 1981, 1982, 1983, 1991
Sait Nagjee Trophy
Champions (4): 1971, 1984, 1991, 1992
Runners-up (2): 1979, 1988
Coochbehar Cup
Champions (5): 1902, 1906, 1909, 1947, 1952
Bordoloi Trophy
Champions (6): 1969, 1970, 1985, 1986, 1991, 2018
Runners-up (5): 1965, 1966, 1971, 1977, 1983
DCM Trophy
Champions (4): 1958, 1961, 1964, 1980
Runners-up (3): 1960, 1982, 1983
All Airlines Gold Cup
Champions (3): 1986, 1996, 2010
Runners-up (7): 1987, 1988, 1989, 1990, 2005, 2011, 2012
Independence Day Cup
Champions (5): 1969, 1971, 1972, 1988, 2007
Runners-up (1): 2018
Sikkim Governor's Gold Cup
Champions (3): 1980, 2016, 2019
Runners-up (4): 1986, 1987, 1989, 1991
Kalinga Cup
Champions (3): 1964, 1991, 2012
Darjeeling Gold Cup
Champions (1): 1984
Runners-up (1): 2018
Stafford Challenge Cup
Champions (4): 1968, 1970, 1981, 1991
Bodoland Martyrs Gold Cup
Champions (2): 2004, 2018
Du Mont Morency Cup
Winners (1): 1939
Nizam Gold Cup
Champions (1): 1983
Vizag Trophy
Champions (1): 1986
Kohima Royal Gold Cup
Runners-up (1): 1996
Amta Sanghati Gold Cup
Runners-up (1): 2015
Sri Krishna Gold Cup
Champions (2): 1965, 1966
Narayana Trophy
Champions (1): 1971

Awards

 Banga Bibhushan: 2022

Club records and influence
Influence

The name of Bangladeshi club based in Dhaka – Mohammedan Sporting Club — is derived from Mohammedan Sporting Club of Kolkata. Members of the Nawab family of Dhaka established Muslim Sports Club as a local club for the youth. A few years later, the family renamed the club as Mohammedan Sporting Club'', after its more renowned predecessor Mohammedan SC of Kolkata.

Overall records
First Indian team to win the Calcutta Football League in the pre-independence era in 1934, and repeated the feat of becoming again the first Indian side to win the same in the post-independence era in 1948.
First Indian team to win the Calcutta Football League five years in-a-row from 1934 to 1938.
Only Indian team to win the Calcutta League in the very first year of its promotion in 1934.
First Indian team to win the Durand Cup by beating Royal Warwickshire Regiment 2–1 (7 December 1940).
First Indian team to win the Rover's Cup in 1940, without conceding a goal.
First Indian team to score 100 goals in one year, when they scored 110 goals in all competitions held in 1941.
They are the first Indian team to win a trophy overseas when they won the Aga Khan Gold Cup in Dhaka, Bangladesh, in 1960, beating Indonesian side PSM Makassar 4–1 in final.
Only Indian club to reach the semi-final of Nehru Centenary Club Cup in 1990, the only international club championship held in the country.
Before the partition of India, Taj Mohammed was the first Pakistani player to sign with Mohammedan as a foreign recruit, and after Partition, Masood Fakhri became the first Pakistani international to sign with the club.
Kaiser Shumsher Jang Bahadur Rana, the Prince of Nepal was the first Hindu player to don club colours in 1943.
Majid Bishkar was the club's first foreigner who played at the FIFA World Cup (represented Iran at the 1978 FIFA World Cup).
The first foreign coach of Mohammedan was Chibuzor Nwakanma from Nigeria, who had also played for the club previously.
Former Indian cricket team captain Sourav Ganguly is club's first brand ambassador.

Notable wins against foreign teams

{| class="wikitable" style="font-size:80%; width:95%; text-align:center"
|-
!width="12%" style="background:black; color:white; text-align:center;"|Competition
!width="6%" style="background:black; color:white; text-align:center;"|Round
!width="10%" style="background:black; color:white; text-align:center;"|Year
!width="13%" style="background:black; color:white; text-align:center;"|Opposition
!width="5%" style="background:black; color:white; text-align:center;"|Score
!width="13%" style="background:black; color:white; text-align:center;"|Venue
!width="7%" style="background:black; color:white; text-align:center;"|City
!width="7%" style="background:black; color:white; text-align:center;"|Ref
|-
|Durand Cup
|Final
|1940
 Royal Warwickshire Regiment
|style="text-align:center; background:#CCFFCC;"|2–1
|Irwin Amphitheatre
|New Delhi
|
|-
|IFA Shield
|Final
|1941
 King's Own Scottish Borderers
|style="text-align:center; background:#CCFFCC;"|2–0
|Eden Gardens
|Calcutta
|
|-
|Aga Khan Gold Cup
|Final
|1960
 PSM Makassar
|style="text-align:center; background:#CCFFCC;"|4–1
|Dacca National Stadium
|Dhaka
|
|-
|DCM Trophy
|Quarter-Final
|1982
 East Fremantle Tricolore
| style="text-align:center; background:#CCFFCC;" |1–0
|Ambedkar Stadium
|New Delhi
|
|-
|Nehru Centenary Club Cup
|Group Stage
|1990
 Zambia national team
| style="text-align:center; background:#CCFFCC;" |1–0
|Vivekananda Yuba Bharati Krirangan
|Kolkata
|
|-
|Nehru Centenary Club Cup
|Group Stage
|1990
 Metalist 1925 Kharkiv
| style="text-align:center; background:#CCFFCC;" |1–0
|Vivekananda Yuba Bharati Krirangan
|Kolkata
|
|-
|IFA Shield
|Group Stage
|2011
 Shandong Luneng Taishan
| style="text-align:center; background:#CCFFCC;" |1–0
|Vivekananda Yuba Bharati Krirangan
|Kolkata
|
|-
|IFA Shield
|Final
|2014
 Sheikh Jamal Dhanmondi
| style="text-align:center; background:#CCFFCC;" |1–14–3 
|Vivekananda Yuba Bharati Krirangan
|Kolkata
|
|-
|Sikkim Gold Cup
|Final
|2016
 Jhapa XI
|style="text-align:center; background:#CCFFCC;"|1–0
|Paljor Stadium
|Gangtok
|
|}

Club award
Shaan-e-Mohammedan is the lifetime achievement award presented by the club annually since 2015, to respect and laud footballing personalities for their indispensable contribution to the club during their career. The award is usually presented either on the foundation day of the club or on the occasion of Iftar when the club organises Dawat-e-Iftar for the current and former players and coaches along with other distinct personalities.

Women's football
Mohammedan Sporting women's football section was instituted for the first time in 2022 and participated in the 2022–23 Calcutta Women's Football League. They went past the group stage and qualified for the knockouts, where they finished as semi-finalists in their inaugural season before losing to the eventual winners East Bengal.

Other departments

Cricket
The cricket section of Mohammedan Sporting is headquartered at the Tent Maidan, and they practice at both Kolkata Maidan fields and Mohammedan Sporting Ground. The men's cricket team primarily competes in the Cricket Association of Bengal (CAB) First Division tournament and also participate in JC Mukherjee T-20 Trophy, A. N. Ghosh Memorial Trophy, CAB One Day League and P. Sen Trophy.
 
The women's cricket team of Mohammedan participates in the CAB run Bengal Women's T20 League. On 24 February 2022, they emerged champions in the league, defeating Rajasthan Club at Kalyani Stadium.

Futsal

Mohammedan SC participates in Futsal Club Championship, highest level of club futsal competition in India. It is currently the only club from West Bengal to participate in the competition.

Athletics
The club has an athletics divisions for numerous track and field sports and the athletes represent the club in the annual athletics meet hosted all across the state, including the ones hosted by the neighbouring sports club like Mohun Bagan and East Bengal.

Hockey 
Club's hockey team was affiliated with Bengal Hockey Association and is currently defunct. Since the British rule in India, the club participated in prestigious tournaments like Beighton Cup and Calcutta Hockey League. Mohammedan won the 1945 and 1959 editions of Calcutta Hockey League. They also achieved runner-up position in Beighton Cup thrice in 1945, 1957 and 1981.

See also
 Football in Kolkata
 List of football clubs in India
 List of football clubs in Kolkata
 History of Indian football

Footnotes

References

Further reading

Dutta, P. L., Memoir of "Father of Indian Football" Nagendraprasad Sarbadhikary (Calcutta: N. P. Sarbadhikary Memorial Committee, 1944) (hereafter Memoir)

Roselli, John. Self Image of Effeteness: Physical Education and Nationalism in Nineteenth Century Bengal. Past & Present (journal). 86 (February 1980). p. 121–48.
Sinha, Mrinalini. Colonial Masculinity, The Manly Englishman and the Effeminate Bengali in the Late Nineteenth Century (Manchester: Manchester University Press, 1995).
Chatterjee, Partha. The Nation and Its Fragments: Colonial and Post-colonial Histories (Calcutta: Oxford University Press, 1995).
Das, Communal Riots in Bengal, p. 170; Amrita Bazar Patrika, 8 July 1946, 4; File-5/27/46 Poll (I), the IB Daily Summary Information of 8 July 1946.
Ispahani, Qaid-E-Azam Jinnah, p. 4; McPherson, Muslim Microcosm, p. 121.
Mason, Football on the Maidan, p. 144; Dimeo, Football and Politics in Bengal, p. 62.
 Shahabuddin, K. S. (2012). Chapter 7. Summer Holidays and Football in Calcutta (archived; 23 September 2013).

External links

Mohammedan SC at Soccerway (archived)

Mohammedan SC on YouTube
Mohammedan SC news archive at Anandabazar Patrika 
Mohammedan SC at ESPN
Mohammedan SC at Indian Football Association (archived)

 
Football clubs in Kolkata
1891 establishments in India
Association football clubs established in 1891
I-League clubs
I-League 2nd Division clubs
Sports clubs in India
Multi-sport clubs in India